The Babaloos is a 1995–1998 animated series produced by Cinar, France Animation, and Ravensburger Film and TV.

Plot
The show is about a group of home appliances that live in a suburban house. They are nocturnal, meaning they are able to sleep in the day and be awake in the night. Among these characters are staunch Mrs. Fork, gentle Spoon, cheerful Mr. Bowl, curious Baby Towel, his caring mother Mommy Towel, and adventurous and intelligent Pencil. In each episode, they encounter an everyday problem that they must conquer before Kevin, the boy living in the house, wakes up.

Telecast
The series aired first on CBC. The series aired on Cartoon Network in the United States as part of Small World. The series also aired on Kika (Germany) and Canal J (France).

References

External links

1990s Canadian animated television series
1990s French animated television series
Canadian children's animated fantasy television series
French children's animated fantasy television series
Television series by Cookie Jar Entertainment